Prince Philippos of Greece and Denmark (born 26 April 1986) is the youngest child of Constantine II (1940–2023) and Anne-Marie of Denmark, who were the last King and Queen of Greece, from 1964 to 1973.

Early life and education 

Philippos was born at St Mary's Hospital, London, on 26 April 1986, the son of King Constantine II and Queen Anne-Marie of Greece. His family had been living in exile since December 1967 His father was deposed in 1973 and the monarchy abolished 8 December 1974.

He was baptized in the Greek Orthodox Church at Saint Sophia Cathedral, London, on 10 July 1986, with King Juan Carlos I of Spain, Prince Philip, Duke of Edinburgh, Diana, Princess of Wales, Infanta Elena of Spain, Princess Benedikte of Denmark, Kyril, Prince of Preslav and Penelope, Lady Romsey serving as godparents.

He attended the Hellenic School at London and the United World Colleges in the US. Later on he studied at Georgetown University, graduating in 2008 with his bachelor's degree in foreign relations. As of 2018, he lives in New York City and works as an analyst for Ortelius Capital.

Personal life 
In 2018, Philippos began dating Nina Nastassja Flohr, the daughter of Swiss businessman Thomas Flohr, who founded the private jet rental company VistaJet, and Katharina Flohr (née Konečný), former Creative Director of Fabergé and editor-in-chief of the Russian Vogue. That same year, they appeared together in public at the wedding of Princess Eugenie of York and Jack Brooksbank. They made other appearances as a couple, including the wedding of Lord Edward Spencer-Churchill and Kimberly Hammerstroem in 2018 and the wedding of Jean-Christophe, Prince Napoléon and Countess Olympia von und zu Arco-Zinneberg in 2019. In 2020 while vacationing in Ithaca, Greece, Flohr and Prince Philippos became engaged. The engagement was announced by the former Greek royal family's press office on 1 September 2020. They were married civilly on 12 December 2020 in a private ceremony in St. Moritz, Switzerland. Due to the COVID-19 pandemic in Switzerland, the only guests at the wedding were the couple's fathers. A Greek Orthodox ceremony took place on 23 October 2021, at Metropolitan Cathedral of Athens.

Titles, styles and honours

Titles and styles 
Following the deposition of the Greek monarchy in 1973, the title "Prince of Greece" with the style of Royal Highness is no longer legally recognised by the government of the Hellenic Republic. Through his male-line descent from Christian IX of Denmark, he is also a Danish prince with the style of Highness.

Honours 

 House of Glücksburg-Greece: Grand Cross of the Royal Order of the Redeemer
 House of Glücksburg-Greece: Grand Cross of the Royal Order of Saints George and Constantine
 House of Glücksburg-Greece: Officer of the Royal Order of George I
 House of Glücksburg-Greece: Officer of Royal Order of the Phoenix

Ancestry

References 

1986 births
Living people
20th-century Greek people
21st-century Greek people
People from London
Greek princes
Danish princes
Georgetown University alumni
House of Glücksburg (Greece)
Sons of kings
Members of the Church of Greece
People from Paddington
People educated at a United World College
Children of Constantine II of Greece